Don Sharpless (January 8, 1933 – August 2, 2017) was an American sound engineer. He was nominated for an Academy Award in the category Best Sound for the film The Hindenburg. Sharpless was also nominated for an Primetime Emmy Award in the category Outstanding Sound Mixing for his work on the television program Fame.

Selected filmography
 The Hindenburg (1975; co-nominated with Leonard Peterson, John A. Bolger Jr. and John L. Mack)

References

External links

1933 births
2017 deaths
American audio engineers
20th-century American engineers